Pougues-les-Eaux is a commune in the Nièvre department in central France. Pougues-les-Eaux station has rail connections to Nevers, Cosne-sur-Loire and Paris.

Demographics

See also
 Communes of the Nièvre department

References

Communes of Nièvre